The 1988 IAAF World Women's Road Race Championships was the sixth edition of the annual international road running competition organised by the International Amateur Athletics Federation (IAAF). The competition was hosted by Australia on 20 March 1988 in Adelaide and featured one race only: a 15K run for women. There were individual and team awards available, with the national team rankings being decided by the combined finishing positions of a team's top three runners. Countries with fewer than three finishers were not ranked. This was the only time that the event was held in the first half of the year.

Norway's Ingrid Kristiansen defended her title with a winning time of 48:24 minutes. Wang Xiuting of China was runner-up nearly two minutes behind and was shortly followed by Zoya Ivanova, who took third place ten seconds later. Ivanova led a Soviets to a comfortable win in the team competition with a total of 21 points coming from her, Yekaterina Khramenkova and Lyudmila Matveyeva. China, entering the competition for the first time took second in the team race through Wang, fourth-placed Zhong Huandi and Wang Huabi in 25th. Portugal, the defending team champions, were led to third place by Conceição Ferreira.

Results

Individual

Team

References

1988
IAAF World Women's Road Race Championships
IAAF World Women's Road Race Championships
IAAF World Women's Road Race Championships
Sports competitions in Adelaide
International athletics competitions hosted by Australia